The Second Founding: How the Civil War and Reconstruction Remade the Constitution is a non-fiction book written by Eric Foner and published by W.W. Norton & Company in 2019. The book recounts the history of the Reconstruction era amendments to the U.S. Constitution and the historical efforts by the U.S. Supreme Court and certain states to undermine these amendments, as well as efforts to undermine the lawful right for all citizens to vote and enjoy full citizenship. Foner also demonstrates the relevance of this history to our present day.

Awards
Longlisted for the Cundill History Prize

See also

 African American founding fathers of the United States

References

External links

Discussion by Eric Foner. Boston Athenæum. Boston, MA. December 11, 2019.

2019 non-fiction books
American history books
Works about the American Civil War
History of the Supreme Court of the United States
Legal history of the United States
Constitutional history of the United States
W. W. Norton & Company books